The 1998 New Hampshire Wildcats football team was an American football team that represented the University of New Hampshire as a member of New England Division of the Atlantic 10 Conference during the 1998 NCAA Division I-AA football season. In its 27th and final year under head coach Bill Bowes, the team compiled a 4–7 record (3–5 against conference opponents) and finished in a tie for third place in the New England Division.

Schedule

References

New Hampshire
New Hampshire Wildcats football seasons
New Hampshire Wildcats football